St. Luke's Church is a historic Episcopal church located at Church Hill, Queen Anne's County, Maryland. It was built between 1729 and 1732 as the parish church for St. Luke's Parish, which had been established in 1728.

It is one story high, five bays long and three bays wide, with brick exterior walls laid in Flemish bond with glazed headers. The structure features a gambrel roof and semicircular apse.

It was listed on the National Register of Historic Places in 1977.  Congressman Joshua Seney is buried in the churchyard.

References

External links

, including photo from 1983, at Maryland Historical Trust
St. Luke's, Church Hill & St. Andrew's, Sudlersville in Queen Anne's County website

Episcopal church buildings in Maryland
Anglican parishes in the Province of Maryland
Churches in Queen Anne's County, Maryland
Churches on the National Register of Historic Places in Maryland
Churches completed in 1732
18th-century Episcopal church buildings
National Register of Historic Places in Queen Anne's County, Maryland